The Australian Athletics Championships have been conducted since 1890.  The most successful athlete at the Championships has been thrower Warwick Selvey who won 19 championships events.  Below is a list of Australian champions in athletics by event. Through 1965, the distances run were in Imperial units (yards).  1966 saw a wholesale conversion to metric units.

100 metres
Note: 100 yards until 1966

1890: Not held
1891: Not held
1892: Not held
1893: Not held
1894: Billy MacPherson
1895: Not held
1896: Bill Cartwright
1897: Not held
1898: Stan Rowley
1899: Not held
1900: Stan Rowley
1901: Not held
1902: George Moir
1903: Not held
1904: Herb Hunter
1905: Not held
1906: Nigel Barker
1907: Not held
1908: Nigel Barker
1909:  Not held
1910: William Woodger (NZL)
1911:  Not held
1912: Ron Opie (NZL)
1913:  Not held
1914: George Parker (USA)
1915:  Not held
1916: Not held
1917:  Not held
1918: Not held
1919:  Not held
1920: William Hunt
1921:  Not held
1922: Slip Carr
1923: Not held
1924: Les Parker
1925: Not held
1926: Les Parker
1927: Not held
1928: Jimmy Carlton
1929: Not held

1930: Jim Carlton
1931: Not held
1932: Jim Carlton
1933: Not held
1934: Noel Dempsey
1935: Not held
1936: Ted Hampson
1937: Not held
1938: Howard Yates
1939: Not held
1940: Not held
1941: Not held
1942: Not held
1943: Not held
1944: Not held
1945: Not held
1946: Not held
1947: John Treloar
1948: John Treloar
1949: Lloyd LaBeach (PAN)
1950: John Treloar
1951: Bill de Gruchy
1952: Hec Hogan
1953: Hec Hogan
1954: Hec Hogan
1955: Hec Hogan
1956: Hec Hogan
1957: Hec Hogan
1958: Hec Hogan
1959: Brian Waters
1960: Dennis Tipping
1961: Gary Holdsworth
1962: Gary Holdsworth
1963: Bob Lay
1964: Bob Lay
1965: Bob Lay
1966: Gary Holdsworth
1967: Gary Holdsworth
1968: Mel Pender (USA)
1969: Greg Lewis

1970: Eric Bigby
1971: Eric Bigby
1972: Laurie d'Arcy (NZL)
1973: David Stokes
1974: Graham Haskell
1975: Graham Haskell
1976: Greg Lewis
1977: Paul Narracott
1978: Paul Narracott
1979: Paul Narracott
1980: Richard James
1981: Peter Gandy
1982: Paul Narracott
1983: Paul Narracott
1984: Paul Narracott
1985: Fred Martin
1986: Gerrard Keating
1987: Shane Naylor
1988: Shane Naylor
1989: David Dworjanyn
1990: Tim Jackson
1991: Dean Capobianco
1992: Shane Naylor
1993: Dean Capobianco
1994: Damien Marsh
1995: Shane Naylor
1996: Damien Marsh
1997: Steve Brimacombe
1998: Matt Shirvington
1999: Matt Shirvington
2000: Matt Shirvington
2001: Matt Shirvington
2002: Matt Shirvington
2003: Patrick Johnson
2004: Josh Ross
2005: Josh Ross
2006: Josh Ross
2007: Josh Ross
2008: Otis Gowa
2009: Josh Ross

2010: Aaron Rouge-Serret
2011: Aaron Rouge-Serret
2012: Josh Ross
2013: Josh Ross
2014: Tim Leathart
2015: Joshua Clarke
2016: Alex Hartmann
2017: Joseph Millar (NZL)
2018: Trae Williams
2019: Edward Osei-Nketia (NZL)
2020: Not held
2021: Rohan Browning
2022: Jake Doran

200 metres
Note: 220 yards until 1966

1890: Not held
1891: Not held
1892: Not held
1893: Not held
1894: Billy MacPherson
1895: Not held
1896: Bill Cartwright
1897: Not held
1898: Stan Rowley
1899: Not held
1900: Stan Rowley
1901: Not held
1902: George Moir
1903: Not held
1904: Nigel Barker
1905: Not held
1906: Nigel Barker
1907: Not held
1908: Nigel Barker
1909: Not held
1910: William Woodger (NZL)
1911:  Not held
1912: Ron Opie (NZL)
1913: Not held
1914: George Parker (USA)
1915: Not held
1916: Not held
1917: Not held
1918: Not held
1919: Not held
1920: William Hunt
1921: Not held
1922: Slip Carr
1923: Not held
1924: Norm Grehan
1925: Not held
1926: Norm Grehan
1927: Not held
1928: Jimmy Carlton
1929: Not held

1930: Jim Carlton
1931: Not held
1932: Jim Carlton
1933: Not held
1934: Howard Yates
1935: Not held
1936: Ray Moffat
1937: Not held
1938: Howard Yates
1939: Not held
1940: Not held
1941: Not held
1942: Not held
1943: Not held
1944: Not held
1945: Not held
1946: Not held
1947: John Bartram
1948: John Treloar
1949: Herb McKenley (JAM)
1950: John Treloar
1951: John Bartram
1952: John Treloar
1953: Brian Butterfield
1954: Hec Hogan
1955: Douglas Winston
1956: Hec Hogan
1957: Kevan Gosper
1958: Terry Gale
1959: Don Bursill
1960: Dennis Tipping
1961: Gary Holdsworth
1962: Peter Vassella
1963: Gary Holdsworth
1964: Gary Holdsworth
1965: Gary Eddy
1966: Peter Norman
1967: Peter Norman
1968: Peter Norman
1969: Peter Norman

1970: Peter Norman
1971: Bruce Weatherlake
1972: Greg Lewis
1973: Greg Lewis
1974: Richard Hopkins
1975: Peter Fitzgerald
1976: Greg Lewis
1977: Colin McQueen
1978: Colin McQueen
1979: Colin McQueen
1980: Bruce Frayne
1981: Bruce Frayne
1982: Peter Gandy
1983: Bruce Frayne
1984: Peter Van Miltenburg
1985: Clayton Kearney
1986: Robert Stone
1987: John Dinan
1988: Kieran Finn (IRE)
1989: Darren Clark
1990: Robert Stone
1991: Dean Capobianco
1992: Dean Capobianco
1993: Damien Marsh
1994: Steve Brimacombe
1995: Steve Brimacombe
1996: Dean Capobianco
1997: Steve Brimacombe
1998: Chris Donaldson (NZL)
1999: Chris Donaldson (NZL)
2000: Darryl Wohlsen
2001: Patrick Johnson
2002: David Geddes
2003: Patrick Johnson
2004: Ambrose Ezenwa (NGR)
2005: Daniel Batman
2006: Patrick Johnson
2007: Joshua Ross
2008: Daniel Batman
2009: Aaron Rouge-Serret

2010: Patrick Johnson
2011: Aaron Rouge-Serret
2012: Joseph Millar (NZL)
2013: Josh Ross
2014: Mangar Chuot
2015: Banuve Tabakaucoro (FIJ)
2016: Alex Hartmann
2017: Joseph Millar (NZL)
2018: Alex Hartmann
2019: Alex Hartmann
2020: Not held
2021: Alexander Beck

400 metres
Note: 440 yards until 1966

1890: Not held
1891: Not held
1892: Not held
1893: Not held
1894: Billy MacPherson
1895: Not held
1896: W. Low (NZL)
1897: Not held
1898: Charles Campbell
1899: Not held
1900: William Shea
1901: Not held
1902: A. Oxlade
1903: Not held
1904: Nigel Barker
1905: Not held
1906: Nigel Barker
1907: Not held
1908: Nigel Barker
1909:  Not held
1910: Nigel Barker
1911:  Not held
1912: Ron Opie (NZL)
1913:  Not held
1914: George Parker (USA)
1915:  Not held
1916: Not held
1917:  Not held
1918: Not held
1919:  Not held
1920: Bart Linehan
1921:  Not held
1922: William Hutton
1923: Not held
1924: Les Tracey (NZL)
1925: Not held
1926: Roy Norman
1927: Not held
1928: Charles Stuart
1929: Not held

1930: Herbert Bascombe
1931: Not held
1932: Francis O'Brien
1933: Not held
1934: George Golding
1935: Not held
1936: Howard Yates
1937: John Mumford
1938: Not held
1939: Not held
1940: Not held
1941: Not held
1942: Not held
1943: Not held
1944: Not held
1945: Not held
1946: Not held
1947: John Bartram
1948: John Bartram
1949: Edwin Carr
1950: Edwin Carr
1951: Leon Gregory
1952: Edwin Carr
1953: Graham Gipson
1954: Bill Job
1955: Leon Gregory
1956: Kevan Gosper
1957: Kevan Gosper
1958: Kevan Gosper
1959: Kevan Gosper
1960: Kevan Gosper
1961: Brian Waters
1962: Ken Roche
1963: Ken Roche
1964: Ken Roche
1965: Paul Bowman
1966: Gary Eddy
1967: Gary Eddy
1968: Jim Kemp (USA)
1969: Bill Hooker

1970: Ross Wilson
1971: Ross Wilson
1972: Wayne Collett (USA)
1973: Graeme Wright
1974: Steve Gee
1975: Steve Gee
1976: Rick Mitchell
1977: Rick Mitchell
1978: John Higham
1979: Colin McQueen
1980: Rick Mitchell
1981: Mike Willis
1982: Gary Minihan
1983: Gary Minihan
1984: Bruce Frayne
1985: Miles Murphy
1986: Darren Clark
1987: Miles Murphy
1988: Miles Murphy
1989: Darren Clark
1990: Darren Clark
1991: Paul Greene
1992: Mark Garner
1993: Darren Clark
1994: Brett Callaghan
1995: Paul Greene
1996: Jamie Baulch (GBR)
1997: Brad Jamieson
1998: Declan Stack
1999: Brad Jamieson
2000: Patrick Dwyer
2001: Paul Pearce
2002: Clinton Hill
2003: Clinton Hill
2004: Clinton Hill
2005: Ben Offereins
2006: John Steffensen
2007: Sean Wroe
2008: Joel Milburn
2009: Sean Wroe

2010: Ben Offereins
2011: Steven Solomon
2012: Steven Solomon
2013: Alexander Beck
2014: Steven Solomon
2015: Craig Burns
2016: Steven Solomon
2017: Steven Solomon
2018: Murray Goodwin
2019: Steven Solomon
2020: Not held
2021: Alexander Beck

800 metres
Note: 880 yards until 1966

1890: Not held
1891: Not held
1892: Not held
1893: Not held
1894: Ken McRae
1895: Not held
1896: Ern Corner
1897: Not held
1898: Charles Campbell
1899: Not held
1900: D'Arcy Wentworth
1901: Not held
1902: D'Arcy Wentworth
1903: Not held
1904: Harvey Sutton
1905: Not held
1906: Greg Wheatley
1907: Not held
1908: W. Trembath (NZL)
1909: Not held
1910: Greg Wheatley
1911: Not held
1912: Guy Harding (NZL)
1913: Not held
1914: Russell Watson
1915: Not held
1916: Not held
1917: Not held
1918: Not held
1919: Not held
1920: Reg Piggott
1921: Not held
1922: Charles Taylor (NZL)
1923: Not held
1924: Tickle Whyte
1925: Not held
1926: Tickle Whyte
1927: Not held
1928: Charles Stuart
1929: Not held

1930: Otto Peltzer (GER)
1931: Not held
1932: Ray Triado
1933: Not held
1934: Thorold Irwin
1935: Not held
1936: Gerald Backhouse
1937: Not held
1938: Gerald Backhouse
1939: Not held
1940: Not held
1941: Not held
1942: Not held
1943: Not held
1944: Not held
1945: Not held
1946: Not held
1947: Jack Stevens
1948: Bill Ramsay
1949: David White
1950: Don MacMillan
1951: Jim Bailey
1952: Don MacMillan
1953: John Landy
1954: Jim Bailey
1955: Don MacMillan
1956: Frank O'Connell
1957: Herb Elliott
1958: Herb Elliott
1959: Tony Blue
1960: Herb Elliott
1961: Russell Oakley
1962: Tony Blue
1963: Tony Blue
1964: John Davies (NZL) Chris Woods (Aus)
1965: Ralph Doubell
1966: Ralph Doubell
1967: Ralph Doubell
1968: Preston Davis	 (USA)
1969: Ralph Doubell

1970: Ralph Doubell
1971: Graeme Rootham
1972: Graeme Rootham
1973: Graeme Rootham
1974: Peter Watson
1975: Colin McCurry
1976: Jamie Botten
1977: John Higham
1978: John Higham
1979: John Higham
1980: Peter Bourke
1981: Michael Hillardt
1982: Peter Bourke
1983: Michael Hillardt
1984: Peter Bourke
1985: Alan Ozolins
1986: Alan Ozolins
1987: Ian Gaudry
1988: Ian Gaudry
1989: Simon Doyle
1990: Dean Kenneally
1991: Simon Doyle
1992: Barry Acres
1993: Simon Lewin
1994: Brendan Hanigan
1995: Sammy Langat (KEN)
1996: Sammy Langat (KEN)
1997: Elijah Maru (KEN)
1998: Noah Ngeny (KEN)
1999: Noah Ngeny (KEN)
2000: Djabir Saïd-Guerni (ALG)
2001: Kris McCarthy
2002: Nicholas Hudson
2003: Kris McCarthy
2004: Samwel Mwera (KEN)
2005: Nick Bromley
2006: Nick Bromley
2007: Nick Bromley
2008: Lachlan Renshaw
2009: Nick Bromley

2010: Lachlan Renshaw
2011: James Kaan
2012: Johnny Rayner
2013: Alexander Rowe
2014: Josh Ralph
2015: Jeff Riseley
2016: Luke Mathews
2017: Luke Mathews
2018: Luke Mathews
2019: Peter Bol
2020: Not held
2021: Peter Bol

1500 metres
Note: The mile run was held from 1930 until 1965, then was replaced by 1500.  An additional mile championship returned between 1987 and 1993 (except 1990).
Mile run

1930: William Whyte
1932: Alex Hillhouse
1934: Fred Colman
1936: Gerald Backhouse
1937: Gerald Backhouse
1947: George Campbell
1948: John Marks
1949: John Marks
1950: Don MacMillan
1951: Don MacMillan
1952: Don MacMillan
1953: John Landy
1954: John Landy
1955: Don MacMillan
1956: John Landy
1957: Herb Elliott
1958: Herb Elliott
1959: Merv Lincoln
1960: Herb Elliott
1961: Trevor Vincent
1962: Albie Thomas
1963: Albie Thomas
1964: Albie Thomas
1965: Albie Thomas
1987: Glenn Ritchie
1988: Simon Doyle
1989: Simon Doyle
1991: Dean Paulin
1992: Andrew Lloyd
1993: Glenn Stojanovic

1500 metres

1966: Jim Grelle (USA)
1967: Laurie Toogood
1968: Peter Watson
1969: Graham Crouch

1970: Chris Fisher
1971: Chris Fisher
1972: Chris Fisher
1973: Peter Watson
1974: Randal Markey
1975: Ken Hall
1976: Peter Fuller
1977: Ken Hall
1978: Graham Crouch
1979: Steve Foley
1980: Michael Hillardt
1981: Steve Foley
1982: Michael Hillardt
1983: Michael Hillardt
1984: Michael Hillardt
1985: Michael Hillardt
1986: Michael Hillardt
1987: Michael Hillardt
1988: Michael Hillardt
1989: Dean Paulin
1990: Andrew Lloyd
1991: Simon Doyle
1992: Pat Scammell
1993: Simon Doyle
1994: Simon Doyle
1995: Darren Lynch
1996: Paul Bitok (KEN)
1997: Paul Bitok (KEN)
1998: Martin Keino (KEN)
1999: Paul Cleary
2000: William Chirchir (KEN)
2001: Clinton Mackevicius
2002: Craig Mottram
2003: Alastair Stevenson
2004: Youcef Abdi
2005: Lachlan Chisholm
2006: Mark Fountain
2007: Mitchell Kealey
2008: Mitchell Kealey
2009: Jeff Riseley

2010: Ryan Gregson
2011: Jeff Riseley
2012: Jeff Riseley
2013: James Kaan
2014: Jeff Riseley
2015: Jeff Riseley
2016: Ryan Gregson
2017: Ryan Gregson
2018: Ryan Gregson
2019: Luke Mathews

5000 metres
Note: 3 miles until 1966

1890: Not held
1891: Not held
1892: Not held
1893: Not held
1894: Charles Herbert
1895: Not held
1896: A. Bell (NZL)
1897: Not held
1898: William Cumming
1899: Not held
1900: P. Malthus (NZL)
1901: Not held
1902: William Simpson (NZL)
1903: Not held
1904: Rufus Ferguson
1905: Not held
1906: William Steele
1907: Not held
1908: G. Sharpe (NZL)
1909: Not held
1910: Miles Dickson (NZL)
1911: Not held
1912: George Hill (NZL)
1913: Not held
1914: James Beatson (NZL)
1915: Not held
1916: Not held
1917: Not held
1918: Not held
1919: Not held
1920: Harry Grandemange
1921: Not held
1922: Reg Webber (NZL)
1923: Not held
1924: Randolph Rose (NZL)
1925: Not held
1926: George Hyde
1927: Not held
1928: Randolph Rose (NZL)
1929: Not held

1930: George Hyde
1931: Not held
1932: Alex Hillhouse
1933: Not held
1934: Fred Colman
1935: Not held
1936: Jack Sheaves
1937: Not held
1938: Walter Weightman
1939: Not held
1940: Not held
1941: Not held
1942: Not held
1943: Not held
1944: Not held
1945: Not held
1946: Not held
1947: George Campbell
1948: Neville McDonald
1949: Neville McDonald
1950: Les Perry
1951: Les Perry
1952: Les Perry
1953: Les Perry
1954: Geoff Warren
1955: David Stephens
1956: John Landy
1957: Albie Thomas
1958: Albie Thomas
1959: Albie Thomas
1960: Dave Power
1961: Dave Power
1962: Dave Power
1963: Trevor Vincent
1964: Bill Baillie (NZL)
1965: Ron Clarke
1966: Ron Clarke
1967: Ron Clarke
1968: Ron Clarke
1969: Ron Clarke

1970: Tony Manning
1971: Kerry O'Brien
1972: Tony Benson
1973: Tony Williams
1974: David Fitzsimons
1975: Andrew Hill
1976: Graham Crouch
1977: David Fitzsimons
1978: David Fitzsimons
1979: David Fitzsimons
1980: Steve Austin
1981: Steve Austin
1982: Steve Austin
1983: Steve Austin
1984: Steve Foley
1985: Andrew Lloyd
1986: Malcolm Norwood
1987: Gerard Barrett
1988: Andrew Lloyd
1989: Phil Clode NZ
1990: Simon Doyle
1991: Rodney Higgins
1992: Andrew Lloyd
1993: Peter O'Donoghue
1994: Julian Paynter
1995: Shaun Creighton
1996: Shaun Creighton
1997: Julian Paynter
1998: Shaun Creighton
1999: Mizan Mehari
2000: Michael Power
2001: Michael Power
2002: Craig Mottram
2003: Michael Power
2004: Craig Mottram
2005: Craig Mottram
2006: Craig Mottram
2007: Craig Mottram
2008: Craig Mottram
2009: Collis Birmingham

2010: Ben St. Lawrence
2011: Bernard Lagat (USA)
2012: Harry Summers
2013: Cameron Page
2014: Collis Birmingham
2015: Brett Robinson
2016: Sam McEntee
2017: David McNeill
2018: Morgan McDonald

10,000 metres
Note: 6 miles until 1966

1950: Not held
1951: Not held
1952: Not held
1953: Geoff Warren
1954: Al Lawrence
1955: David Stephens
1956: Al Lawrence
1957: Geoff Warren
1958: Dave Power
1959: Dave Power
1960: Dave Power
1961: Bob Vagg
1962: Dave Power
1963: Tony Cook
1964: Tony Cook
1965: Geoff Walker
1966: Ron Clarke
1967: John Farrington
1968: Derek Clayton
1969: Ron Clarke
1970: Ron Clarke
1971: John Farrington
1972: Terry Harrison
1973: Brendan Layh
1974: Bill Scott
1975: Chris Wardlaw
1976: David Fitzsimons
1977: David Fitzsimons
1978: David Fitzsimons
1979: David Fitzsimons
1980: Steve Austin
1981: Lawrie Whitty
1982: Gerard Barrett
1983: Steve Austin
1984: Zeph Ncube (ZIM)
1985: Andrew Lloyd
1986: Robert de Castella
1987: Andrew Lloyd
1988: Steve Moneghetti
1989: Andrew Lloyd

1990: Jamie Harrison
1991: Jamie Harrison
1992: Jamie Harrison
1993: Rod Higgins
1994: Jamie Harrison
1995: Robbie Johnston (NZL)
1996: Not held
1997: Julian Paynter
1998: Luke Kipkosgei (KEN)
1999: Luke Kipkosgei (KEN)
2000: Joseph Kimani (KEN)
2001: Luke Kipkosgei (KEN)
2002: Shaun Creighton
2003: Shaun Creighton
2004: Lee Troop
2005: David Ruschena
2006: Andrew Letherby
2007: Galen Rupp (USA)
2008: Collis Birmingham
2009: David McNeill
2010: Collis Birmingham
2011: Josphat Menjo (KEN)
2012: Emmanuel Bett (KEN)
2013: Emmanuel Bett (KEN)
2014: Sam Chelanga (USA)
2015: Brett Robinson
2016: David McNeill
2017: Patrick Tiernan
2018: Stewart McSweyn

Marathon

1900: Not held
1901: Not held
1902: Not held
1903: Not held
1904: Not held
1905: Not held
1906: Not held
1907: Not held
1908: Not held
1909: Andrew Wood
1910: Not held
1911: Not held
1912: Not held
1913: Not held
1914: Not held
1915: Not held
1916: Not held
1917: Not held
1918: Not held
1919: Not held
1920: Not held
1921: Not held
1922: Not held
1923: Not held
1924: Not held
1925: Not held
1926: Not held
1927: Bob McMurdo
1928: Not held
1929: Not held
1930: Not held
1931: Not held
1932: Not held
1933: Not held
1934: Not held
1935: Not held
1936: Not held
1937: Not held
1938: Not held
1939: Not held

1940: Not held
1941: Not held
1942: Not held
1943: Not held
1944: Not held
1945: Not held
1946: Not held
1947: Not held
1948: Not held
1949: Robert Prentice
1950: Not held
1951: Gordon Stanley
1952: Robert Prentice
1953: Roly Guy
1954: Not held
1955: Not held
1956: John Russell
1957: Not held
1958: John Russell
1959: Not held
1960: Ian Sinfield
1961: Not held
1962: Keith Ollerenshaw
1963: Not held
1964: Bob Vagg
1965: Not held
1966: Tony Cook
1967: Derek Clayton
1968: Derek Clayton
1969: John Farrington
1970: John Farrington
1971: Derek Clayton
1972: Bernard Vine
1973: Derek Clayton
1974: John Farrington
1975: John Farrington
1976: Vic Anderson
1977: Rob Wallace
1978: Jim Langford
1979: Robert de Castella

1980: Lawrie Whitty
1981: Garry Bentley
1982: Rob Wallace
1983: John Stanley
1984: Andrew Lloyd
1985: Grenville Wood
1986: Steve Austin
1987: Daniel Böltz
1988: Pat Carroll
1989: Brad Camp
1990: Allan Carman
1991: Sean Quilty
1992: Gerard Barrett
1993: Sean Quilty
1994: Michael Dalton
1995: Roderic deHighden
1996: Magnus Michelsson
1997: Pat Carroll
1998: Greg Lyons
1999: Shaun Creighton
2000: Roderic deHighden
2001: Damon Harris
2002: Jeremy Horne
2003: Paul Arthur
2004: Daniel Green
2005: Brett Cartwright
2006: Lee Troop
2007: Damon Harris
2008: Jeremy Horne
2009: Dale Engler
2010: Rowan Walker
2011: Peter Nowill
2012: Scott Westcott
2013: Alexander Matthews
2014: Rowan Walker
2015: Robert Pope
2016: Thomas Do Canto

110 metres hurdles
Note: 120 yard hurdles until 1966

1890: Not held
1891: Not held
1892: Not held
1893: Not held
1894: Harry Davis
1895: Not held
1896: W. Martin (NZL)
1897: Not held
1898: J. Laidlaw
1899: Not held
1900: Corrie Gardner
1901: Not held
1902: George William Smith (NZL)
1903: Not held
1904: George William Smith (NZL)
1905: Not held
1906: Colin Stewart
1907: Not held
1908: John Davis and Colin Stewart (tie)
1909: Not held
1910: Gerald Keddell (NZL)
1911: Not held
1912: Gerald Keddell (NZL)
1913: Not held
1914: Les Wallman
1915: Not held
1916: Not held
1917: Not held
1918: Not held
1919: Not held
1920: Harry Wilson (NZL)
1921: Not held
1922: Leslie Edmunds
1923: Not held
1924: Robert Almond
1925: Not held
1926: Ernest Scott
1927: Not held
1928: Roger Lander (NZL)
1929: Not held

1930: Alf Watson
1931: Not held
1932: Alf Watson
1933: Not held
1934: Don McLardy
1935: Not held
1936: Sid Stenner
1937: Not held
1938: Sid Stenner
1939: Not held
1940: Not held
1941: Not held
1942: Not held
1943: Not held
1944: Not held
1945: Not held
1946: Not held
1947: Charles Green
1948: Ray Weinberg
1949: Peter Gardner
1950: Ray Weinberg
1951: Ray Weinberg
1952: Ray Weinberg
1953: Ray Weinberg
1954: Ken Doubleday
1955: Ken Doubleday
1956: Ken Doubleday
1957: John Chittick
1958: John Chittick
1959: John Chittick
1960: John Chittick
1961: Dave Prince
1962: Dave Prince
1963: Dave Prince
1964: Dave Prince
1965: Gary Knoke
1966: Richmond Flowers (USA)
1967: Gary Knoke
1968: David James
1969: Mal Baird

1970: Mal Baird
1971: Mal Baird
1972: Mal Baird
1973: Warren Parr
1974: Warren Parr
1975: Max Binnington
1976: Warren Parr
1977: Vin Plant
1978: Vin Plant
1979: Max Binnington
1980: Warren Parr
1981: Max Binnington
1982: Max Binnington
1983: Don Wright
1984: Don Wright
1985: Don Wright
1986: Don Wright
1987: Don Wright
1988: Don Wright
1989: Don Wright
1990: John Caliguri
1991: John Caliguri
1992: Kyle Vander Kuyp
1993: Kyle Vander Kuyp
1994: Kyle Vander Kuyp
1995: Colin Jackson (GBR)
1996: Kyle Vander Kuyp
1997: Kyle Vander Kuyp
1998: Kyle Vander Kuyp
1999: Kyle Vander Kuyp
2000: Tim Ewan
2001: Kyle Vander Kuyp
2002: Colin Jackson (GBR)
2003: Kyle Vander Kuyp
2004: Kyle Vander Kuyp
2005: James Mortimer (NZL)
2006: James Mortimer (NZL)
2007: Justin Merlino
2008: Justin Merlino
2009: Tasuku Tanonaka (JPN)

2010: Greg Eyears
2011: Siddhanth Thingalaya (IND)
2012: Siddhanth Thingalaya (IND)
2013: Siddhanth Thingalaya (IND)
2014: Nicholas Hough
2015: Nicholas Hough
2016: Justin Merlino
2017: Nicholas Hough
2018: Nicholas Hough

400 metres hurdles
Note: 440 yard hurdles until 1966

1890: Not held
1891: Not held
1892: Not held
1893: Not held
1894: David Matson (NZL)
1895: Not held
1896: W. Martin (NZL)
1897: Not held
1898: Arthur Holder (NZL)
1899: Not held
1900: George William Smith (NZL)
1901: Not held
1902: George William Smith (NZL)
1903: Not held
1904: George William Smith (NZL)
1905: Not held
1906: Frank Brown
1907: Not held
1908: Henry St Aubyn Murray (NZL)
1909: Not held
1910: Gerald Keddell (NZL)
1911: Not held
1912: Gerald Keddell (NZL)
1913: Not held
1914: Russell Watson
1915: Not held
1916: Not held
1917: Not held
1918: Not held
1919: Not held
1920: Leslie Edmunds
1921: Not held
1922: Francis Edwards
1923: Not held
1924: Richard Honner
1925: Not held
1926: Alf Watson
1927: Not held
1928: Stan Ramson (NZL)
1929: Not held

1930: Alf Watson
1931: Not held
1932: George Golding
1933: Not held
1934: George Golding
1935: Not held
1936: Alf Watson
1937: Not held
1938: Paul Magee
1939: Not held
1940: Not held
1941: Not held
1942: Not held
1943: Not held
1944: Not held
1945: Not held
1946: Not held
1947: Charles Green
1948: Geoff Goodacre
1949: Geoff Goodacre
1950: Geoff Goodacre
1951: Geoff Goodacre
1952: Ken Doubleday
1953: Ken Doubleday
1954: David Lean
1955: Geoff Goodacre
1956: Geoff Goodacre
1957: Geoff Goodacre
1958: Ron Carter
1959: Barry Stanton
1960: Barry Stanton
1961: Barry Stanton
1962: Ken Roche
1963: Ken Roche
1964: Michael Ryan
1965: Gary Knoke
1966: Gary Knoke
1967: Gary Knoke
1968: Geoff McNamara
1969: Bill Hooker

1970: Gary Knoke
1971: Gary Knoke
1972: Gary Knoke
1973: Gary Knoke
1974: Bruce Field
1975: Max Binnington
1976: Don Hanly
1977: Peter Grant
1978: Gary Cox
1979: Peter Grant
1980: Garry Brown
1981: Garry Brown
1982: Garry Brown
1983: Peter Rwamuhanda (UGA)
1984: Dale Horrobin
1985: Ken Gordon
1986: Ken Gordon
1987: Ken Gordon
1988: Leigh Miller
1989: Leigh Miller
1990: Leigh Miller
1991: Rohan Robinson
1992: Rohan Robinson
1993: Syunji Karube (JPN)
1994: Nick Ward
1995: Rohan Robinson
1996: Rohan Robinson
1997: Rohan Robinson
1998: Rohan Robinson
1999: Dai Tamesue (JPN)
2000: Rohan Robinson
2001: Blair Young
2002: Oliver Jean-Theodore (FRA)
2003: Michael Hazel
2004: Elliott Wood
2005: Nicholas O'Brien (NZL)
2006: Brendan Cole
2007: LaBronze Garrett (USA)
2008: Tristan Thomas
2009: Tristan Thomas

2010: Brendan Cole
2011: Brendan Cole
2012: Tristan Thomas
2013: Tristan Thomas
2014: Ian Dewhurst
2015: Cameron French (NZL)
2016: Keisuke Nozawa (JPN)
2017: Ian Dewhurst
2018: Ian Dewhurst

3000 metres steeplechase

1950: Not held
1951: Not held
1952: Not held
1953: Not held
1954: Not held
1955: Not held
1956: Not held
1957: Not held
1958: Graham Thomas
1959: Graham Thomas
1960: Robert Morgan-Morris
1961: Trevor Vincent
1962: Trevor Vincent
1963: Ron Blackney
1964: Trevor Vincent
1965: Trevor Vincent
1966: Kerry O'Brien
1967: Kerry O'Brien
1968: Peter Welsh (NZL)
1969: Kerry O'Brien
1970: Kerry O'Brien
1971: Kerry O'Brien
1972: Kerry O'Brien
1973: Kerry O'Brien
1974: Fred Langford
1975: Bob Walczak
1976: Peter Larkins
1977: Peter Larkins
1978: Peter Larkins
1979: Peter Larkins
1980: Peter Larkins
1981: Peter Larkins
1982: Gary Zeuner
1983: Peter Larkins
1984: Gary Zeuner
1985: Wayne Dyer
1986: Gary Zeuner
1987: Mike Inwood
1988: Brendan Hewitt
1989: Mike Inwood

1990: Patrick Woods
1991: Shaun Creighton
1992: Shaun Creighton
1993: Shaun Creighton
1994: Shaun Creighton
1995: Chris Unthank
1996: Chris Unthank
1997: Chris Unthank
1998: Chris Unthank
1999: Martin Dent
2000: Chris Unthank
2001: Peter Nowill
2002: Peter Nowill
2003: Peter Nowill
2004: Peter Nowill
2005: Peter Nowill
2006: Youcef Abdi
2007: Peter Nowill
2008: Martin Dent
2009: Youcef Abdi
2010: Youcef Abdi
2011: Youcef Abdi
2012: Peter Nowill
2013: James Nipperess
2014: James Nipperess
2015: Craig Appleby
2016: James Nipperess
2017: Hashim Salah Abbas (QAT)
2018: James Nipperess

20 kilometre road walk

1960: Not held
1961: Not held
1962: Not held
1963: Noel Freeman
1964: Not held
1965: Bob Gardiner
1966: Not held
1967: Frank Clark
1968: Not held
1969: Frank Clark
1970: Noel Freeman
1971: Not held
1972: Peter Fullager
1973: Not held
1974: Peter Fullager
1975: Not held
1976: Willi Sawall
1977: Not held
1978: Willi Sawall
1979: Not held
1980: Peter Fullager
1981: Not held
1982: Willi Sawall
1983: Dave Smith
1984: Dave Smith
1985: Simon Baker
1986: Not held
1987: Dave Smith
1988: Simon Baker
1989: Rod Huxley
1990: Andrew Jachno
1991: Dave Smith
1992: Robert McFadden
1993: Paul Copeland
1994: Not held
1995: Nick A'hern
1996: Nick A'hern
1997: Nick A'hern
1998: Nick A'hern
1999: Dion Russell

2000: Nathan Deakes
2001: Nathan Deakes
2002: Nathan Deakes
2003: Luke Adams
2004: Nathan Deakes
2005: Nathan Deakes
2006: Nathan Deakes
2007: Luke Adams
2008: Jared Tallent
2009: Jared Tallent
2010: Jared Tallent
2011: Jared Tallent
2012: Jared Tallent
2013: Jared Tallent
2014: Dane Bird-Smith
2015: Jared Tallent
2016: Dane Bird-Smith
2017: Dane Bird-Smith

50 kilometres race walk

1950: Not held
1951: Not held
1952: Len Chadwick
1953: Not held
1954: Les Hellyer
1955: Not held
1956: Norman Read (NZL)
1957: Not held
1958: Ted Allsopp
1959: Not held
1960: Noel Freeman
1961: Not held
1962: Ted Allsopp
1963: Not held
1964: Bob Gardiner
1965: Not held
1966: Bob Gardiner
1967: Not held
1968: Bob Gardiner
1969: Not held
1970: Ted Allsopp
1971: Bob Gardiner
1972: Not held
1973: Robin Whyte
1974: Not held
1975: Tim Erickson
1976: Not held
1977: Willi Sawall
1978: Not held
1979: Bruce Cook
1980: Not held
1981: Willi Sawall
1982: Not held
1983: Keith Knox
1984: Andrew Jachno
1985: Mark Dossetor
1986: Willi Sawall
1987: Steve Hausfeld
1988: Michael Harvey
1989: Simon Baker

1990: Michael Harvey
1991: Darius Wojcik
1992: Willi Sawall
1993: Michael Harvey
1994: Michael Harvey
1995: Duane Cousins
1996: Michael Harvey
1997: Dion Russell
1998: Dion Russell
1999: Dion Russell
 Dead-heat with Nathan Deakes
2000: Not held
2001: Liam Murphy
2002: Liam Murphy
2003: Duane Cousins
2004: Chris Erickson
2005: Nathan Deakes
2006: Nathan Deakes
2007: Jared Tallent
2008: Chris Erickson
2009: Jared Tallent
2010: Luke Adams
2011: Jared Tallent
2012: Luke Adams
2013: No finishers
2014: Chris Erickson
2015: Evan Dunfee (CAN)
2016: Matthew Griggs

Pole vault

1890: Not held
1891: Not held
1892: Not held
1893: Not held
1894: J. Gleeson
1895: Not held
1896: H. Kinglsey (NZL)
1897: Not held
1898: Hori Eruera (NZL)
1899: Not held
1900: James Te Paa (NZL)
1901: Not held
1902: Charles Laurie (NZL)
1903: Not held
1904: Charles Laurie (NZL)
1905: Not held
1906: R. Adams
1907: Not held
1908: Len McKay (NZL)
1909: Not held
1910: Leo Walker and Len McKay (NZL)
1911: Not held
1912: Jack Brake
1913: Not held
1914: Jack Brake and Richard Templeton (USA)
1915: Not held
1916: Not held
1917: Not held
1918: Not held
1919: Not held
1920: George Harvey (NZL)
1921: Not held
1922: Roy Harbison
1923: Not held
1924: Roy Harbison
1925: Not held
1926: Norman Shaddock
1927: Not held
1928: Eino Keskinen
1929: Not held

1930: Gordon Harper
1931: Not held
1932: Fred Woodhouse
1933: Not held
1934: Fred Woodhouse
1935: Not held
1936: Fred Woodhouse
1937: Not held
1938: Les Fletcher
1939: Not held
1940: Not held
1941: Not held
1942: Not held
1943: Not held
1944: Not held
1945: Not held
1946: Not held
1947: Ted Winter
1948: Ted Winter
1949: Peter Denton
1950: Peter Denton
1951: Bruce Peever
1952: Peter Denton
1953: Peter Denton
1954: Bruce Peever
1955: Bruce Peever
1956: Bruce Peever
1957: Max Gee
1958: Bruce Peever
1959: John Pfitzner
1960: Ross Filshie
1961: John Pfitzner
1962: Ross Filshie
1963: Trevor Bickle
1964: Ross Filshie
1965: Ross Filshie
1966: Trevor Bickle
1967: Trevor Bickle
1968: Mike Sullivan
1969: Ed Johnson

1970: Ray Boyd
1971: Ed Johnson
1972: Ray Boyd
1973: Ray Boyd
1974: Ray Boyd
1975: Ray Boyd
1976: Ray Boyd
1977: Rob Huddle
1978: Ray Boyd
1979: Ray Boyd
1980: Ray Boyd
1981: Ray Boyd
1982: Ray Boyd
1983: Ray Boyd
1984: Rob Chisholm
1985: Neil Honey
1986: Larry Jessee (USA)
1987: Neil Honey
1988: Neil Honey
1989: Simon Arkell
1990: Tim Foster
1991: Simon Arkell
1992: Simon Arkell
1993: Jimmy Miller
1994: Jimmy Miller
Tie with Scott Huffman (USA)
1995: Jimmy Miller
1996: Jimmy Miller
1997: Jimmy Miller
1998: Dmitri Markov
1999: Viktor Chistiakov
2000: Paul Burgess
2001: Dmitri Markov
2002: Paul Burgess
2003: Dmitri Markov
2004: Dmitri Markov
2005: Paul Burgess
2006: Paul Burgess
2007: Brad Walker (USA)
2008: Steve Hooker
2009: Blake Lucas

2010: Steven Hooker
2011: Sergey Kucheryanu (RUS)
2012: Joel Pocklington
2013: Joel Pocklington
2014: Joel Pocklington
2015: Angus Armstrong
2016: Kurtis Marschall
2017: Kurtis Marschall
2018: Kurtis Marschall

High jump

1890: Not held
1891: Not held
1892: Not held
1893: Not held
1894: William Cole
1895: Not held
1896: James Doyle
1897: Not held
1898: Patrick English
1899: Not held
1900: Patrick English
1901: Not held
1902: Charles Laurie (NZL)
1903: Not held
1904: Patrick English
1905: Not held
1906: Tim Frawley
1907: Not held
1908: Charles Orbell (NZL)
1909: Not held
1910: Jock Smith
1911: Not held
1912: Lester Kelly
1913: Not held
1914: Lester Kelly
1915: Not held
1916: Not held
1917: Not held
1918: Not held
1919: Not held
1920: Harold Harbison
1921: Not held
1922: Roy Harbison
1923: Not held
1924: Laurence Mason
1925: Not held
1926: Laurence Mason
1927: Not held
1928: Ewen Davidson
1929: Not held

1930: Charles Spicer
1931: Not held
1932: Jim Watson
1933: Not held
1934: Douglas Shetliffe
1935: Not held
1936: Douglas Shetliffe
1937: Not held
1938: Douglas Shetliffe
1939: Not held
1940: Not held
1941: Not held
1942: Not held
1943: Not held
1944: Not held
1945: Not held
1946: Not held
1947: John Winter
1948: John Winter
1949: Peter Mullins
1950: John Winter
1951: Georges Damitio (FRA)
1952: Mervyn Peter
1953: John Vernon
1954: John Vernon
1955: Chilla Porter
1956: Chilla Porter
1957: Chilla Porter
1958: Chilla Porter
1959: Chilla Porter
1960: Chilla Porter
1961: Chilla Porter
1962: Percy Hobson
1963: Tony Sneazwell
1964: Tony Sneazwell
1965: Lawrie Peckham
1966: Lawrie Peckham
1967: Lawrie Peckham
1968: Tony Sneazwell
1969: Lawrie Peckham

1970: Lawrie Peckham
1971: Lawrie Peckham
1972: Lawrie Peckham
1973: Lawrie Peckham
1974: Lawrie Peckham
1975: Lawrie Peckham
1976: Gordon Windeyer
1977: Gordon Windeyer
1978: Gordon Windeyer
1979: Michael Dick
1980: David Morrow
1981: David Hoyle
1982: Larry Sayers
1983: Mark Barratt
1984: John Atkinson
1985: Michael Allen
1986: Lee Balkin (USA)
1987: Marc Howard
1988: David Anderson
1989: Ian Garrett
1990: David Anderson
1991: Tim Forsyth
1992: Tim Forsyth
1993: Tim Forsyth
1994: Tim Forsyth
1995: Simon Wojcik
1996: Chris Anderson
1997: Tim Forsyth
1998: Tim Forsyth
1999: Ron Garlett
2000: Nick Moroney
2001: Nick Moroney
2002: Nick Moroney
2003: Joshua Lodge
2004: Nick Moroney
2005: Nick Moroney
2006: Nick Moroney
2007: Liam Zamel-Paez 
2008: Cal Pearce
2009: Liam Zamel-Paez 

2010: Liam Zamel-Paez
2011: Chris Armet
2012: Nick Moroney
2013: Brandon Starc
2014: Nik Bojic
2015: Brandon Starc
2016: Nauraj Singh Randhawa (MAS)
2017: Lee Hup Wei (MAS)
2018: Brandon Starc
2022: Yual Reath

Long jump

1890: Not held
1891: Not held
1892: Not held
1893: Not held
1894: William Cole
1895: Not held
1896: J. Ryan (NZL)
1897: Not held
1898: David Bevan
1899: Not held
1900: Patrick English
1901: Not held
1902: Herb Hunter
1903: Not held
1904: Harry Duigan
1905: Not held
1906: Nigel Barker
1907: Not held
1908: John Davis
1909: Not held
1910: Jock Smith
1911: Not held
1912: Ethelbert Southee
1913: Not held
1914: Jock Smith
1915: Not held
1916: Not held
1917: Not held
1918: Not held
1919: Not held
1920: Richard Honner
1921: Not held
1922: Richard Honner
1923: Not held
1924: Richard Honner
1925: Not held
1926: Hubert Day
1927: Not held
1928: Charles Ebert
1929: Not held

1930: Carl Mahon
1931: Not held
1932: Hubert Day
1933: Not held
1934: Adrian Button
1935: Not held
1936: Jack Lobban
1937: Not held
1938: Basil Dickinson
1939: Not held
1940: Not held
1941: Not held
1942: Not held
1943: Not held
1944: Not held
1945: Not held
1946: Not held
1947: Bill Bruce
1948: Bill Bruce
1949: Bill Bruce
1950: Bill Bruce
1951: Hugh Jack
1952: Peter Cox
1953: Brian Oliver
1954: Hector Hogan
1955: Ian Bruce
1956: Brian Oliver
1957: Hugh Jack
1958: Jim McCann
1959: Maurice Rich
1960: Bevyn Baker
1961: Allen Crawley
1962: John Baguley
1963: Ian Tomlinson
1964: Murray Tolbert
1965: Phil May
1966: Leonid Barkovskyy (URS)
1967: Allen Crawley
1968: Gayle Hopkins (USA)
1969: Phil May

1970: Phil May
1971: Phil May
1972: Murray Tolbert
1973: Chris Commons
1974: Chris Commons
1975: Chris Commons
1976: Chris Commons
1977: Fred Holpen
1978: Steven Knott
1979: Gary Honey
1980: Ian Campbell
1981: Gary Honey
1982: Gary Honey
1983: Gary Honey
1984: Gary Honey
1985: Gary Honey
1986: Gary Honey
1987: Gary Honey
1988: Gary Honey
1989: Gary Honey
1990: David Culbert
1991: Jonathon Moyle (NZL)
1992: David Culbert
1993: Mike Powell  (USA)
1994: Jai Taurima
1995: Craig Furber
1996: Jai Taurima
1997: Shane Hair
1998: Shane Hair
1999: Shane Hair
2000: Peter Burge
2001: Peter Burge
2002: Tim Parravicini
2003: Peter Burge
2004: Shane Hai
2005: Chris Noffke
2006: Fabrice Lapierre
2007: Tim Parravicini
2008: Robert Crowther
2009: Fabrice Lapierre

2010: Fabrice Lapierre
2011: Mitchell Watt
2012: Frederic Erin (FRA)
2013: Fabrice Lapierre
2014: Robert Crowther
2015: Robert Crowther
2016: Fabrice Lapierre
2017: Christopher Mitrevski
2018: Christopher Mitrevski

Triple jump

1920: Not held
1921: Not held
1922: Not held
1923: Not held
1924: Not held
1925: Not held
1926: Not held
1927: Not held
1928: John Shirley (NZL)
1929: Not held
1930: Nick Winter
1931: Not held
1932: Frank Campbell
1933: Not held
1934: Basil Dickinson
1935: Not held
1936: Basil Dickinson
1937: Not held
1938: Jack Metcalfe
1939: Not held
1940: Not held
1941: Not held
1942: Not held
1943: Not held
1944: Not held
1945: Not held
1946: Not held
1947: Ken Doubleday
1948: George Avery
1949: Frank Day
1950: Les McKeand
1951: Peter Cox
1952: Kevin Miller
1953: Brian Oliver
1954: Brian Oliver
1955: Kevin Salt
1956: Brian Oliver
1957: Ian Tomlinson
1958: Ian Tomlinson
1959: Ian Tomlinson

1960: John Baguley
1961: John Baguley
1962: Ian Tomlinson
1963: Graham Boase
1964: Ian Tomlinson
1965: Ian Tomlinson
1966: Phil May
1967: Phil May
1968: Phil May
1969: Phil May
1970: Mick McGrath
1971: Phil May
1972: Mick McGrath
1973: Phil May
1974: Mick McGrath
1975: Mick McGrath
1976: Don Commons
1977: Don Commons
1978: Mick McGrath
1979: Ian Campbell
1980: Ken Lorraway
1981: Ken Lorraway
1982: Ken Lorraway
1983: Ken Lorraway
1984: Ken Lorraway
1985: Peter Beames
1986: Peter Beames
1987: Peter Beames
1988: Peter Beames
1989: Matt Sweeney
1990: Andrew Murphy
1991: Matt Sweeney
1992: Matt Sweeney
1993: Peter Burge
1994: Andrew Murphy
1995: Andrew Murphy
1996: Andrew Murphy
1997: Andrew Murphy
1998: Larry Achike (GBR)
1999: Andrew Murphy

2000: Rogel Nachum (ISR)
2001: Andrew Murphy
2002: Andrew Murphy
2003: Andrew Murphy
2004: Andrew Murphy
2005: Michael Perry
2006: Andrew Murphy
2007: Alwyn Jones
2008: Alwyn Jones
2009: Alwyn Jones
2010: Henry Frayne
2011: Adam Rabone
2012: Alwyn Jones
2013: Alwyn Jones
2014: Phillips Idowu (GBR)
2015: Alwyn Jones
2016: Alwyn Jones
2017: Ryoma Yamamoto (JPN)
2018: Emmanuel Fakiye

Shot put

1890: Not held
1891: Not held
1892: Not held
1893: Not held
1894: Timothy O'Connor (NZL)
1895: Not held
1896: W. Rhodes (NZL)
1897: Not held
1898: Patrick English
1899: Not held
1900: George Hawkes
1901: Not held
1902: Bill O'Reilly
1903: Not held
1904: Bill O'Reilly
1905: Not held
1906: Bill O'Reilly
1907: Not held
1908: Bill O'Reilly
1909: Not held
1910: Bill O'Reilly
1911: Not held
1912: Dan McGrath
1913: Not held
1914: Edgar Caughey (USA)
1915: Not held
1916: Not held
1917: Not held
1918: Not held
1919: Not held
1920: Patrick Munro (NZL)
1921: Not held
1922: Leslie Rouse
1923: Not held
1924: Patrick Munro (NZL)
1925: Not held
1926: Alex McIntosh
1927: Not held
1928: Patrick Munro (NZL)
1929: Not held

1930: Alex McIntosh
1931: Not held
1932: Alex McIntosh
1933: Not held
1934: William Mackenzie
1935: Not held
1936: Harry Wilson
1937: Not held
1938: William Mackenzie
1939: Not held
1940: Not held
1941: Not held
1942: Not held
1943: Not held
1944: Not held
1945: Not held
1946: Not held
1947: Arch Howie
1948: Trevor Evans
1949: Trevor Evans
1950: Peter Mullins
1951: Trevor Evans
1952: Peter Hanlin
1953: Peter Hanlin
1954: Peter Hanlin
1955: Peter Hanlin
1956: Peter Hanlin
1957: Peter Hanlin
1958: Peter Hanlin
1959: James Penfold
1960: Warwick Selvey
1961: Warwick Selvey
1962: Warwick Selvey
1963: Warwick Selvey
1964: Warwick Selvey
1965: Merv Kemp
1966: Warwick Selvey
1967: Warwick Selvey
1968: Jay Silvester (USA)
1969: Ray Rigby

1970: Peter Phillips
1971: Peter Phillips
1972: Ray Rigby
1973: Ray Rigby
1974: Mike Barry
1975: Merv Kemp
1976: Alex Brown
1977: Peter Taylor
1978: Wayne Martin
1979: Ray Rigby
1980: Matt Barber
1981: Phil Nettle
1982: Matt Barber
1983: Ray Rigby
1984: Ray Rigby
1985: Stuart Gyngell
1986: Stuart Gyngell
1987: John Minns
1988: John Minns
1989: John Minns
1990: Craig Watson
1991: Werner Reiterer
1992: Craig Watson
1993: John Minns
1994: John Minns
1995: John Minns
1996: Pavol Pankuch (SVK)
1997: Clay Cross
1998: Justin Anlezark
1999: Clay Cross
2000: Justin Anlezark
2001: Justin Anlezark
2002: Justin Anlezark
2003: Justin Anlezark
2004: Justin Anlezark
2005: Clay Cross
2006: Scott Martin
2007: Christian Cantwell (USA)
2008: Justin Anlezark
2009: Justin Anlezark

2010: Scott Martin
2011: Dale Stevenson
2012: Emanuele Fuamatu
2013: Damien Birkinhead
2014: Damien Birkinhead
2015: Jacko Gill (NZL)
2016: Matthew Cowie
2017: Damien Birkinhead
2018: Damien Birkinhead

Discus

1920: Not held
1921: Not held
1922: A. West
1923: Not held
1924: Patrick Munro (NZL)
1925: Not held
1926: Roy Thomson
1927: Not held
1928: Patrick Munro (NZL)
1929: Not held
1930: Joe Watson
1931: Not held
1932: John Wallace
1933: Not held
1934: William Mackenzie
1935: Not held
1936: Harry Wilson
1937: Not held
1938: Keith Pardon
1939: Not held
1940: Not held
1941: Not held
1942: Not held
1943: Not held
1944: Not held
1945: Not held
1946: Not held
1947: Keith Pardon
1948: Ian Reed
1949: Ian Reed
1950: Ian Reed
1951: Keith Pardon
1952: Keith Pardon
1953: Keith Pardon
1954: Ian Reed
1955: Anthony Kenk
1956: Charles Rann
1957: Ves Balodis
1958: Ves Balodis
1959: Ves Balodis

1960: Warwick Selvey
1961: Harry Mitsilias
1962: Warwick Selvey
1963: Warwick Selvey
1964: Warwick Selvey
1965: Warwick Selvey
1966: Warwick Selvey
1967: Warwick Selvey
1968: Jay Silvester (USA)
1969: Len Vlahov
1970: Warwick Selvey
1971: Warwick Selvey
1972: Warwick Selvey
1973: Warwick Selvey
1974: Dick Priman
1975: Len Vlahov
1976: Merv Kemp
1977: Dick Priman
1978: Wayne Martin
1979: James Howard (USA)
1980: Phil Nettle
1981: Phil Nettle
1982: Vlad Slavnic
1983: Paul Nandapi
1984: Paul Nandapi
1985: Paul Nandapi
1986: Paul Nandapi
1987: Paul Nandapi
1988: Werner Reiterer
1989: Werner Reiterer
1990: Werner Reiterer
1991: Werner Reiterer
1992: Werner Reiterer
1993: Werner Reiterer
1994: Werner Reiterer
1995: Werner Reiterer
1996: Justin Anlezark
1997: Gerard Duffy
1998: Ian Winchester (NZL) 
1999: Gerard Duffy

2000: Ian Winchester (NZL) 
2001: Aaron Neighbour
2002: Peter Elvy
2003: Peter Elvy
2004: Scott Martin
2005: Scott Martin
2006: Scott Martin
2007: Benn Harradine
2008: Benn Harradine
2009: Bertrand Vili (FRA) 
2010: Benn Harradine
2011: Benn Harradine
2012: Benn Harradine
2013: Julian Wruck
2014: Benn Harradine
2015: Julian Wruck
2016: Matthew Denny
2017: Julian Wruck
2018: Matthew Denny

Hammer throw

1890: Not held
1891: Not held
1892: Not held
1893: Not held
1894: Timothy O'Connor
1895: Not held
1896: R. Martin (NZL)
1897: Not held
1898: J. Milward
1899: Not held
1900: W. Madill (NZL)
1901: Not held
1902: Bill O'Reilly
1903: Not held
1904: Bill O'Reilly
1905: Not held
1906: Bill O'Reilly
1907: Not held
1908: Jack Kearney
1909: Not held
1910: Bill O'Reilly
1911: Not held
1912: Dan McGrath
1913: Not held
1914: Jack McHolm (NZL)
1915: Not held
1916: Not held
1917: Not held
1918: Not held
1919: Not held
1920: Jack McHolm (NZL)
1921: Not held
1922: Leslie Rouse
1923: Not held
1924: Jack McHolm (NZL)
1925: Not held
1926: William Harvey (NZL)
1927: Not held
1928: William Harvey (NZL)
1929: Not held

1930: Not held
1931: Not held
1932: Not held
1933: Not held
1934: Myer Rosenblum
1935: Not held
1936: Myer Rosenblum
1937: Not held
1938: Keith Pardon
1939: Not held
1940: Not held
1941: Not held
1942: Not held
1943: Not held
1944: Not held
1945: Not held
1946: Not held
1947: Keith Allen
1948: Keith Allen
1949: Keith Allen
1950: Keith Pardon
1951: Keith Pardon
1952: Keith Pardon
1953: Keith Pardon
1954: Tom Mullins
1955: Keith Pardon
1956: Herb Barker
1957: Charlie Morris
1958: Charlie Morris
1959: Dick Leffler
1960: Dick Leffler
1961: Dick Leffler
1962: Dick Leffler
1963: Dick Leffler
1964: Dick Leffler
1965: Dick Leffler
1966: Dick Leffler
1967: Dick Leffler
1968: Walter Grob
1969: Dick Leffler

1970: Dick Leffler
1971: Ron Frawley
1972: Ron Frawley
1973: Dick Leffler
1974: Gus Puopolo
1975: Gus Puopolo
1976: Gus Puopolo
1977: Gus Puopolo
1978: Gus Puopolo
1979: Gus Puopolo
1980: Loris Bertolacci
1981: Hans Lotz
1982: Hans Lotz
1983: Hans Lotz
1984: Hans Lotz
1985: Hans Lotz
1986: Joe Quigley
1987: Sean Carlin
1988: Sean Carlin
1989: Joe Quigley
1990: Sean Carlin
1991: Yuriy Sedykh (URS)
1992: Sean Carlin
1993: Sean Carlin
1994: Sean Carlin
1995: Sean Carlin
1996: Sean Carlin
1997: Stuart Rendell
1998: Stuart Rendell
1999: Stuart Rendell
2000: Stuart Rendell
2001: Stuart Rendell
2002: Stuart Rendell
2003: Stuart Rendell
2004: Stuart Rendell
2005: Stuart Rendell
2006: Stuart Rendell
2007: Hiroaki Doi (JPN)
2008: Hiroaki Doi (JPN)
2009: Mark Dickson

2010: Hiroaki Doi (JPN)
2011: Timothy Driesen
2012: Timothy Driesen
2014: Timothy Driesen
2015: Matthew Denny
2016: Matthew Denny
2017: Matthew Denny
2018: Matthew Denny

Javelin

1920: Not held
1921: Not held
1922: Alfred Reid
1923: Not held
1924: Denis Duigan
1925: Not held
1926: Stan Lay (NZL)
1927: Not held
1928: Stan Lay (NZL)
1929: Not held
1930: George Bronder
1931: Not held
1932: George Bronder
1933: Not held
1934: Bert Sheiles
1935: Not held
1936: Bert Sheiles
1937: Not held
1938: Jack Metcalfe
1939: Not held
1940: Not held
1941: Not held
1942: Not held
1943: Not held
1944: Not held
1945: Not held
1946: Not held
1947: Bert Sheiles
1948: Trevor Evans
1949: Trevor Evans
1950: Les McKeand
1951: Alex Hakelis
1952: Alex Hakelis
1953: James Achurch
1954: James Achurch
1955: Bob Grant
1956: Bob Grant
1957: Bob Grant
1958: Nick Birks
1959: Nick Birks

1960: Nick Birks
1961: Nick Birks
1962: Alf Mitchell
1963: Nick Birks
1964: Nick Birks
1965: Nick Birks
1966: Nick Birks
1967: Reg Spiers
1968: Ronald Carlton
1969: Sig Koscik
1970: Sig Koscik
1971: Peter Lawler
1972: Sig Koscik
1973: Sig Koscik
1974: Nick Birks
1975: Sig Koscik
1976: Manfred Rohkamper
1977: Reg Spiers
1978: Manfred Rohkamper
1979: Garry Calvert
1980: Manfred Rohkämper
1981: Mike O'Rourke (NZL)
1982: Garry Calvert
1983: Dave Dixon
1984: Dave Dixon
1985: John Stapylton-Smith (NZL)
1986: Murray Keen
1987: Gavin Lovegrove (NZL) 
1988: Ben Hodgson
1989: Gavin Lovegrove (NZL) 
1990: Jean-Paul Lakafia (FRA)
1991: Yki Laine (FIN)
1992: Cameron Graham
1993: Andrew Currey
1994: Andrew Currey
1995: Andrew Currey
1996: Andrew Currey
1997: Adrian Hatcher
1998: Andrew Currey
1999: Andrew Currey

2000: Andrew Currey
2001: William Hamlyn-Harris
2002: Andrew Currey
2003: Andrew Currey
2004: William Hamlyn-Harris
2005: Oliver Dziubak
2006: Stuart Farquhar (NZL)
2007: Jarrod Bannister 
2008: Jarrod Bannister
2009: Stuart Farquhar (NZL)
2010: Jarrod Bannister
2011: Jarrod Bannister
2012: Joshua Robinson
2013: Jarrod Bannister
2014: Joshua Robinson
2015: Matthew Outzen
2016: Stuart Farquhar (NZL)
2017: Hamish Peacock
2018: Hamish Peacock

Decathlon

1920: Not held
1921: Not held
1922: Not held
1923: Not held
1924: Denis Duigan
1925: Not held
1926: Max Kroger
1927: Not held
1928: Eino Keskinen
1929: Not held
1930: Not held
1931: Not held
1932: Not held
1933: Not held
1934: Not held
1935: Not held
1936: Not held
1937: Not held
1938: Not held
1939: Not held
1940: Not held
1941: Not held
1942: Not held
1943: Not held
1944: Not held
1945: Not held
1946: Not held
1947: Not held
1948: Not held
1949: Not held
1950: Not held
1951: Not held
1952: Not held
1953: Not held
1954: Not held
1955: Not held
1956: Not held
1957: Not held
1958: Not held
1959: Not held

1960: Pat Leane
1961: Nick Birks
1962: Nick Birks
1963: Roy Williams (NZL*)
1964: Nick Birks
1965: John O'Neill
1966: Wayne Athorne
1967: John Hamann
1968: Geoff Smith
1969: Geoff Smith
1970: Geoff Smith
1971: Terry Beaton
1972: Sam Caruthers (USA), Robbie Goff (1st Aust.)
1973: Robbie Goff
1974: Sanitesi Latu (TGA), Terry Beaton (1st Aust.)
1975: Rob Lethbridge
1976: Peter Hadfield
1977: Peter Hadfield
1978: Sanitesi Latu
1979: Peter Hadfield
1980: Peter Hadfield
1981: Peter Hadfield
1982: Peter Hadfield
1983: Peter Hadfield
1984: Peter Hadfield
1985: Peter Hadfield
1986: Simon Shirley
1987: Stuart Andrews
1988: Simon Shirley
1989: Chris Bradshaw
1990: Paul Scott
1991: Paul Scott
1992: Dean Smith
1993: Peter Winter
1994: Dean Smith
1995: Leslie Kuorikoski
1996: Peter Winter
1997: Peter Banks
1998: Jagan Hames
1999: Scott Ferrier

2000: Klaus Ambrosch (AUT), Jagan Hames (1st Aust.)
2001: Matthew McEwen
2002: Scott Ferrier
2003: Matthew McEwen
2004: Matthew McEwen
2005: Eric Surjan
2006: Jason Dudley
2007: Eric Surjan
2008: Jason Dudley
2009: Brent Newdick (NZL), Stephen Cain (1st Aust.)
2010: Stephen Cain
2011: Jarrod Sims
2012: Brent Newdick (NZL), Jarrod Sims (1st Aust.)
2013: Scott McLaren (NZL), Kyle McCarthy (1st Aust.)
2014: Jake Stein
2015: David Brock 
2016: Cedric Dubler 
2017: Cedric Dubler
2018: Cedric Dubler
2019: Daniel Golubovic (USA), Kyle Cranston (1st Aust.)
2020: Cedric Dubler
2021: Ashley Moloney
2022: Cedric Dubler

See also
Athletics Australia
List of Australian athletics champions (women)
Australian Championships in Athletics

References

Australian Athletics Historical Results

Australian Athletics Championships
Australian men
Athletics
Australian champions